Senthilnathan Jambulingam is an Indian film director, screenwriter, producer and television actor who predominantly works in Tamil cinema and serials, based in Chennai. He is best known for his action-masala films. As of 2013, he has directed more than twenty five films.

Personal life
He is the son of director Jambulingam who directed M. G. Ramachandran starrer Nam Naadu. Senthilnathan cast his son, Vinod, in the lead role of Unnai Naan (2004).

Film career
Initially, he worked as an assistant to director M. Bhaskar in Soolam (1980) and Pakkathu Veetu Roja (1982). He then worked as an assistant director under S. A. Chandrasekhar for 7 years from Sattam Oru Iruttarai until Needhikku Thandanai (1987). At that time, he befriended with actor Vijayakanth who promised him to act in his films in the future. When producers proposed him to direct a film, he met Vijayakanth but the actor was in a busy schedule. Waiting for his availability, he worked as an assistant director under V. Azhagappan in three films. Senthilnathan finally made his directorial debut in 1988 with the Tamil film Poonthotta Kaavalkaaran. The film turned out to be a blockbuster.

In 2001, he agreed terms with producer Ibrahim Rowther to make a film titled Kadhal Mudal Kadhal Varai, which would have debutant Bala Kumaran and Uma in the lead role. The film would have marked the director's 25th film, but the producer's financial troubles meant that the film was shelved.

Filmography

Television

Other works

References

External links

1957 births
Living people
Film directors from Chennai
Tamil film directors
Film producers from Chennai
Tamil television directors
20th-century Indian film directors
21st-century Indian film directors